Eberhard I (–4 July 1308) was a German nobleman. He was Count of the Mark from 1277 until his death.  He was the son of Engelbert I, Count of the Mark and Kunigunde of Blieskastel (died 1265), daughter of Count Henry I of Blieskastel.

In 1277, Count Herman of Lohn abducted Eberhard's father Engelbert I, Count of the Mark near Tecklenburg and imprisoned him in the Castle of Bredevoort, where he later died.  In 1278 Eberhard took revenge and conquered the castle.

From 1281, Eberhard formed an alliance with the Counts of Berg, Cleve and Jülich against the Electorate of Cologne and gained the independence of the County of Mark from the Archbishop of Cologne after the victory in the Battle of Worringen in 1288. He also obtained Brakel, Westhofen and Waltrop.  Eberhard died 4 July 1308 and was buried in Fröndenberg Monastery.

Marriage and children
Eberhard married first about 29 January 1273 to Irmgard of Berg (c.1256–24 March 1294), daughter of Adolf VII of Berg.  They had seven children:

 Engelbert II (c.1275–1328)
 Adolph II of La Marck, Prince-bishop of Liège (1278–1344)
 Margaret (c.1280–after 14 August 1327), married in 1299 Gerhard of Katzenelnbogen (c.1270–1311/12)
 Kunigunde († after 25 February 1343), married in 1320 Dietrich II of Heinsberg-Blankenburg († 1361)
 Irmgard
 Konrad (1291/94–1353), married Elisabeth of Cleves
 Catharine, abbess of Froendenberg (born c.1293)

Eberhard married second Maria of Looz and had:
 Richarda, married John III of Reifferscheidt-Bedburg
 Johanna, married Philip IV of Reifferscheidt-Wildenberg
 Engelbert I, Lord of Loverval

References 

Counts of the Mark
1250s births
1308 deaths